The 2014 All-Ireland Senior Camogie Championship—known as the Liberty Insurance All-Ireland Senior Camogie Championship for sponsorship reasons— is the premier competition of the 2014 camogie season. Nine county teams compete in the Senior Championship out of twenty-seven who compete overall in the Senior, Intermediate and Junior Championships. It commences on 21 June.

Structure 
The nine teams are drawn into two groups, one of four teams (Group 1) and one of five (Group 2). All the teams play each other once, scoring two points for a win and one for a draw. 
The two group runners-up and the two third-placed teams play in the quarter-finals.
The two group winners and the two quarter-final winners play in the semi-finals.
The semi-final winners contest the 2014 All-Ireland Senior Camogie Championship Final

Fixtures and results

Group stages

Group 1

Group 2

Final stages

All-Ireland final

References

External links
 Camogie Association

2014
2014
All-Ireland Senior Camogie Championship